Deedi Damodaran is an Indian screenwriter who works in Malayalam cinema. Gulmohar (2008)  is her first film in Malayalam directed by Jayaraj, starring Ranjith, Siddique, Augustine, and Neenu Mathew. She is the daughter of the veteran screen writer of Malayalam cinema T.Damodaran. She is one of the founding members of Women in Cinema Collective,WCC , the organization for the welfare of women workers of Malayalam movie industry.

Filmography

 Gulmohar (2008)
 Makal in Kerala kafe (2009)
Nayika (2011)
 John (2022)

References

External links
 Interview with Deedi Damodaran
 https://www.onmanorama.com/entertainment/interviews/2019/02/13/deedi-damodaran-opens-about-battle-with-cancer.html
 https://www.thecue.in/author/diidi-daamoodrn

Malayalam screenwriters
Indian women screenwriters
Living people
1969 births